The West End Cares Song Contest was introduced in the late nineties to provide a platform for outstanding new material performed in the Theatre. The winning song also titled an album produced from the chosen finalists.

West End Cares is one of the many AIDS/HIV charity collectives now embodied in 'Theatre Cares'  which itself is mirrored throughout the Theatrical world (for example 'Broadway Cares').

British theatre awards